The Wells Fargo Plaza is a high-rise skyscraper located on 221 North Kansas Street in Downtown El Paso, Texas, United States. It opened as the State National Bank Plaza on October 25, 1971. It is 302 feet (92 m) tall. It is designed in the International Style.

The tower sits on a base three stories high, then rises to its full height. The repetitive angular windows add another International Style element of blocky appearance and expression of structure.

The tower is lit at night with up to 13 horizontal white lines (originally 17).  A U.S. Flag design is used during patriotic holidays, and a Christmas tree design is used during the holiday season. The letters "UTEP" are used during the football and basketball season for the University of Texas at El Paso, and, less frequently, the Texas Tech University logo is also used.

See also
List of tallest buildings in El Paso

References

External links
http://www.wellsfargo.com
Emporis.com
http://www.coppersquare.com

Wells Fargo buildings
Skyscrapers in Texas
Skyscrapers in El Paso, Texas
Office buildings completed in 1971
Skyscraper office buildings in Texas
Charles Luckman buildings